Qwest Records is the American record label started by Quincy Jones in 1980 as a joint venture with Warner Bros. Records, and owned by Warner Music Group, although Jones was still under contract with A&M Records through 1981. George Benson's 1980 Give Me the Night LP was the first release on Qwest, although it was shared with Warner Bros. Records, where Benson was under contract. One of the first artists to sign with Qwest was Jones's goddaughter, Patti Austin. Qwest released Every Home Should Have One in 1981.

Although it focused on the R&B market, its signings included Frank Sinatra (whom Jones produced in the 1960s), Tevin Campbell, Radiance, and British alternative dance group New Order (as well as the backlog of their earlier post-punk incarnation, Joy Division). 

Quincy Jones - NME - May 1990

The label also ventured into hip hop music during the 1990s. Qwest also discovered R&B artist Tamia, who enjoyed a long career. The gospel group the Winans signed with the label in 1985. Táta Vega was also signed and released Now I See through Qwest. Robert Stewart, who performed on the Pulitzer Prize-winning Wynton Marsalis recording Blood on the Fields, was signed to the label in 1994. His two albums for Qwest, In the Gutta and The Force, received critical acclaim. 

Qwest was shut down in 2000, with Warner Bros. Records acquiring the remainder. The roster was either absorbed by Warner Bros., dropped, or left in limbo. In 2006, select titles by Jones were licensed to Universal Music for distribution and re-pressed, but everything else remained at Warner Bros., including deleted titles.

References

See also
 List of record labels

Record labels established in 1980
American record labels
Vanity record labels
Hip hop record labels
Contemporary R&B record labels
Soul music record labels
Warner Records
Quincy Jones
Jazz record labels